The San Rafael Hills are a mountain range in Los Angeles County, California. They are one of the lower Transverse Ranges, and are parallel to and below the San Gabriel Mountains, adjacent to the San Gabriel Valley overlooking the Los Angeles Basin.

Geography
The San Rafael Hills contain all or parts of the communities of City Terrace, La Cañada Flintridge, Pasadena, South Pasadena, El Sereno, Monterey Hills, Montecito Heights, Cypress Park, Mount Washington, Glassell Park and foothills surrounding Eagle Rock, east of the Glendale Freeway including Rancho San Rafael and Chevy Chase Canyon in Glendale. They define the valley area of Pasadena and San Marino, and retain a large aquifer on the hills' north side, from the San Gabriel Valley.

History
They were the homeland, with settlements, of the Tongva Native American people for over 8,000 years before the Spanish invasion and colonization of the late 18th century.  They are named after the Rancho San Rafael, a 1784 Spanish land grant beyond the hills to the west.

Landmarks
The hillside campus of Art Center College of Design, a Pasadena historic resource, is located in the San Rafael Hills.

Ernest E. Debs Regional Park is a large nature preserve and regional park in the western section of the hills, with walking and bicycle trails.

See also
Verdugo Mountains
Chino Hills
Puente Hills
San Gabriel Mountains
Casa Adobe De San Rafael

References

 
Transverse Ranges
Mountain ranges of Los Angeles County, California
Hills of California
Geography of Los Angeles
Geography of Pasadena, California
Geography of the San Gabriel Valley
Arroyo Seco (Los Angeles County)
Northeast Los Angeles
San Gabriel Mountains
Eagle Rock, Los Angeles
Glassell Park, Los Angeles
Highland Park, Los Angeles
La Cañada Flintridge, California
Lincoln Heights, Los Angeles
Montecito Heights, Los Angeles
San Marino, California
South Pasadena, California
Mountain ranges of Southern California